Eppan an der Weinstraße, often abbreviated to Eppan or Appiano, is a comune (municipality) in South Tyrol in northern Italy, located about  southwest of the city of Bolzano.

Geography

Eppan borders the following municipalities: Andrian, Bolzano, Kaltern, Nals, Terlan, Unsere Liebe Frau im Walde-St. Felix, Vadena, Cavareno, Fondo, Malosco, Sarnonico, and Ronzone.

Frazioni
The municipality of Eppan contains the frazioni (subdivisions, mainly villages and hamlets) Frangart (Frangarto), Girlan (Cornaiano), Missian (Missiano), Montiggl (Monticolo), Perdonig (Predonico), St. Michael (San Michele), St. Pauls (San Paolo), Unterrain (Riva di Sotto).

History

Coat-of-arms
The emblem represents the coat-of-arms of the farm Hocheppan owned by the Lords of Eppan since the 9th century. In the left side it is depicted half star with eight rays and the crescent moon to the right, both of or on azure background. The emblem was adopted in 1967.

Notable sights 
 Ansitz Kreit

Society

Linguistic distribution
According to the 2011 census, 86.23% of the population speak German, 13.29% Italian, and 0.48% Ladin as first language.

Demographic evolution

Notable people 
 Egno von Eppan (died 1273), nobleman, prince-bishop of Brixen and Trent
 Johann Georg Platzer (1704–1761), Rococo painter and draughtsman
 Leonhard von Call (1767–1815), composer and virtuoso on the mandolin and guitar
 Sepp Kerschbaumer (1913–1964) South Tyrolean freedom fighter/terrorist, born in Frangart (Frangarto)
 George McAnthony (1966–2011), country singer and songwriter
 Sabina Panzanini (born 1972) former Alpine skier, competed at the 1994 and 1998 Winter Olympics

References

External links
 Official website  

Municipalities of South Tyrol
Nonsberg Group